Events during the year 2009 in Poland.

Incumbents

Events

February 
 17 February –  Rescue helicopter Mil Mi-2 of the Polish Medical Air Rescue has crashed in Jarostów; pilot and HCM were killed and the doctor severely injured.
 27 February – Combat helicopter Mil Mi-24 of the Polish Air Force has crashed in Szadłowice; pilot was killed, two other crew members lightly injured.

marzec 
 31 March – An-28 Bryza-2RF transport plane of Polish Air Force has crashed in the Babie Doły district of Gdynia; entire crew (four persons) was killed.

April 
 6 April – one death and 25 wounded in a train crash near Białogard
 13 April – Kamień Pomorski homeless hostel fire. 23 deaths. President of Poland declared a 3-day national mourning.

maj 
 31 May – last flight of the Polish airline Centralwings

June 
 Poland hit by 2009 European floods
 7 June: European Parliament election takes place in Poland.

August 
 30 August- Su-27 combat plane of Belorussian Air Force has crashed during the Radom Air Show 2009; entire crew (two persons) was killed.

September 
 18 September: 20 deaths and 37 wounded following 2009 Wujek-Śląsk mine blast

October

Deaths

February 
 7 February: Piotr Stańczak, Polish geologist beheaded by Islamic terrorists in Pakistan

See also
2009 in Polish television

 
Poland
pl:2009#Wydarzenia w Polsce